Wiechert is a German surname. Notable people with the surname include:

 Emil Wiechert (1861–1928), German physicist and geophysicist
 Ernst Wiechert (1887–1950), German teacher, poet, and writer

See also
 Weichert (surname)

German-language surnames